The men's triple jump at the 2010 European Athletics Championships was held at the Estadi Olímpic Lluís Companys on 27 and 29 July.

Medalists

Records

Schedule

Results

Qualification
Qualification: Qualification Performance 16.75 (Q) or at least 12 best performers advance to the final.

Final

References
 Qualification Results
Final Results
Full results

Triple jump
Triple jump at the European Athletics Championships